Luis Jorge Bayardo Ramírez (born October 28, 1935 in  Tecolotlan, Jalisco, Mexico), is a Mexican television actor. His film career began in the last years of the Golden Age of Mexican cinema.

Filmography

Films

Television

Self

References

External links 

1935 births
Living people
20th-century Mexican male actors
21st-century Mexican male actors
Mexican male telenovela actors
Male actors from Jalisco